Lalazar Safari Park is a park located on the Lalazar mountain top at a height of 9,000 feet in Nathiagali, Murree. Most of the wildlife in Murree is based in this park.

It is part of Ayubia National Park.

Summer resort
The park also acts like a summer resort and some rare animals such as snow leopard and bird species can be found there.

References

Parks in Murree
Zoos in Pakistan